"Show Biz Kids" is a song composed by Walter Becker and Donald Fagen and performed by Steely Dan with Rick Derringer on slide guitar. It was the first single from Steely Dan's 1973 album Countdown to Ecstasy, and reached number 61 on the Billboard Hot 100.

Cash Box said that the song has "an infectious chorus delivered a la Nilsson's "Coconut" hit."

Personnel
Donald Fagen – piano, lead vocals, backing vocals
Walter Becker – electric bass, harmonica, background vocals
Jim Hodder – drums, percussion, background vocals
Rick Derringer – slide guitar (recorded at Caribou Ranch, Nederland, Colorado, courtesy of Columbia Records)
Victor Feldman – marimba, percussion
Sherlie Matthews, Myrna Matthews, Patricia Hall, Royce Jones, James Rolleston – background vocals

References

External links
 Song Review by AllMusic

1973 songs
Steely Dan songs
ABC Records singles
Songs written by Donald Fagen
Songs written by Walter Becker
1973 singles
Song recordings produced by Gary Katz